Arabic Supplement is a Unicode block that encodes Arabic letter variants used for writing non-Arabic languages, including languages of Pakistan and Africa, and old Persian.

Block

History
The following Unicode-related documents record the purpose and process of defining specific characters in the Arabic Supplement block:

References 

Unicode blocks